Troitsky is a rural locality (a khutor) in Naumovsky Selsoviet Rural Settlement, Konyshyovsky District, Kursk Oblast, Russia. Population:

Geography 
The khutor is located on the Chmacha River (a left tributary of the Svapa River), 46 km from the Russia–Ukraine border, 80 km north-west of Kursk, 18 km north-west of the district center – the urban-type settlement Konyshyovka, 7.5 km from the selsoviet center – Naumovka.

 Climate
Troitsky has a warm-summer humid continental climate (Dfb in the Köppen climate classification).

Transport 
Troitsky is located 39 km from the federal route  Ukraine Highway, 55 km from the route  Crimea Highway, 22.5 km from the route  (Trosna – M3 highway), 17 km from the road of regional importance  (Fatezh – Dmitriyev), 18 km from the road  (Konyshyovka – Zhigayevo – 38K-038), 7 km from the road  (Dmitriyev – Beryoza – Menshikovo – Khomutovka), 3 km from the road of intermunicipal significance  (Konyshyovka – Makaro-Petrovskoye, with the access road to the villages of Belyayevo and Chernicheno), on the road  (38N-144 – Troitsky), 10 km from the nearest railway halt 536 km (railway line Navlya – Lgov-Kiyevsky).

The rural locality is situated 86 km from Kursk Vostochny Airport, 175 km from Belgorod International Airport and 287 km from Voronezh Peter the Great Airport.

References

Notes

Sources

Rural localities in Konyshyovsky District